Joseph Hetherington (11 April 1892–1971) was an English footballer who played in the Football League for Lincoln City, Preston North End, Norwich City and South Shields.

References

1892 births
1971 deaths
English footballers
Association football forwards
English Football League players
Gateshead A.F.C. players
Preston North End F.C. players
Lincoln City F.C. players
Durham City A.F.C. players
Norwich City F.C. players
Guildford City F.C. players
Walker Celtic F.C. players